The International Journal of Transgender Health (IJTH) is a quarterly peer-reviewed academic journal covering research on gender dysphoria and gender incongruence, the medical treatment of transgender individuals, social and legal acceptance of gender affirming surgery, and professional and public education on transgender health. It also publishes WPATH's Standards of Care, guest editorials, policy statements, letters to the editor, and review articles. The journal aims to inform a broad audience including policy makers, practitioners, and the general public.

It is the official journal of the World Professional Association for Transgender Health. The editor-in-chief is Walter Pierre Bouman (National Centre for Transgender Health and the University of Nottingham, Nottingham, UK). The journal is published by Taylor & Francis.

Abstracting and indexing
The journal is abstracted and indexed in CINAHL, SocINDEX, EBSCO databases, Scopus, International Bibliography of the Social Sciences, PASCAL, and PsycINFO.

History

Past editors
Friedemann Pfäfflin (University of Ulm)
Eli Coleman (University of Minnesota Medical School)
Richard Ekins (University of Ulster)
Dave King (University of Liverpool)
Walter O. Bockting (Columbia University)

See also
Transgender Studies Quarterly

References

External links
 

Sexology journals
Taylor & Francis academic journals
Quarterly journals
English-language journals
Transgender literature
Transgender studies
Publications established in 1997
LGBT-related journals